Winter X Games XIII were held from January 22 to January 25, 2009 in Aspen, Colorado. They were the 8th consecutive Winter X Games to be held in Aspen. The events were broadcast on ESPN and ABC.

The 13th games introduced the X Games' current theme song: a remix of Peter Gabriel's "Games Without Frontiers" featuring Lord Jamar.

Disciplines
The following were the events at Winter X Games 13.

Skiing
Snowboarding
Snowmobiling

Results

Skiing

Men's Monoski Cross

Men's Ski SlopeStyle

Men's Skier X

Men's Ski Superpipe

Men's Ski Big Air

Women's Skier X

Women's Ski Superpipe

Women's Ski SlopeStyle

Snowboarding

Men's Snowboard Superpipe

Men's Snowboard Big Air

Men's Snowboard SlopeStyle

Men's Snowboarder X

Women's Snowboard Superpipe

Women's Snowboard SlopeStyle

Women's Snowboarder X

Snowmobiling

Men's Snowmobile Freestyle

Men's Snowmobile SnoCross

Men's Snowmobile Speed & Style

Men's Snowmobile Best Trick

References

Winter X Games
2009 in multi-sport events
2009 in American sports
Sports in Colorado
Pitkin County, Colorado
2009 in sports in Colorado
Winter multi-sport events in the United States
International sports competitions hosted by the United States
January 2009 sports events in the United States